Pierre-Julien is a masculine French given name. Notable people with the name include:

 Pierre-Julien Gilbert (1783–1860), French painter specialised in naval scenes
 Pierre-Julien Leclair (1860–1897), Canadian politician

See also 
 Pierre (given name)
 Julien (given name)

Compound given names
French masculine given names